Athanur is a panchayat town in Namakkal district  in the state of Tamil Nadu, India.

Demographics
 India census, Athanur had a population of 9014. Males constitute 51% of the population and females 49%.  Athanur has an average literacy rate of 55%, lower than the national average of 59.5%; with 59% of the males and 41% of females literate. 11% of the population is under 6 years of age.

References 

Cities and towns in Namakkal district